Samdhan is a town and a nagar panchayat in Kannauj district in the Indian state of Uttar Pradesh.

Demographics
 India census, Samdhan had a population of 25,310. Males constitute 53% of the population and females 47%. Samdhan has an average literacy rate of 35%, lower than the national average of 59.5%: male literacy is 44%, and female literacy is 25%. In Samdhan, 21% of the population is under 6 years of age.

References

Cities and towns in Kannauj district